A Dead Secret is a 1957 play by Rodney Ackland. It is a murder drama set in 1911 London and is based on the Seddon murder trial.

Plot
Insurance agent Frederick Dyson owns a house in London with his wife.  Among the lodgers is a misery elderly woman, Miss Lummus, who hoards her money in the house.  When she is murdered, Dyson is charged with the crime.

1959 British television version
A version aired 3 March 1959 as part of British television series ITV Play of the Week. The adaptation was by John McKeller. This version is believed to be lost.

1959 Australian television version

A television version aired 21 May 1959 on Australian broadcaster ABC. This version aired live in Melbourne, and was kinescoped for interstate broadcasts. It is not known if the kinescope still exists.

It was made when Australian drama was very rare. It starred Bryce Archer who was in the film Smiley Gets a Gun.

Cast
Bruce Archer as Alfie, Miss Lummus' adoptive son
Kenneth Goodlett as Frederick Dyson
Elizabeth Wing as Mrs Dyson
Moira Carlicion as Miss Lummus
Bettina Kauffman
Edward Howell
Campbell Copelin
Lewis Tegart
Carol Armstrong

Reception
The TV critic for the Sydney Morning Herald thought that the "potential dramatic richness" of the play "was not fully exploited" because the director "had little time—or space—to create the atmosphere which can come much more easily to a stage director". However he did think the production "was, without any startling virtues, nevertheless a satisfactory piece of domestic entertainment.

1963 Australia radio version
A radio version aired 15 December 1963 on Melbourne Australia radio station LO.

1963 Australian television version

An Australian television version aired 1963 on ABC.

Cast
 Ron Haddrick as Frederick Dyson
 Marion Johns as Mrs Dyson
 Lyndall Barbour as dead woman
 Thelma Scott as Henrietta Spicer
 Walter Sullivan as Arthur Lovecraft QC
 Tom Farley as Dyson's Father

See also
 List of live television plays broadcast on Australian Broadcasting Corporation (1950s)

References

External links
 1959 ITV version on IMDb
 1959 ABC version on IMDb
 1963 ABC version on IMDb
Photographs of 1959 TV production at National Archives of Australia

1957 plays
1959 television films
1959 films
1963 television films
1963 films
English-language television shows
Black-and-white Australian television shows
Australian live television shows
Australian Broadcasting Corporation original programming
1950s Australian television plays
1960s Australian television plays
British plays
Lost television episodes
Films directed by William Sterling (director)
1960s English-language films
1950s English-language films